The 1975 Pan American Games were held in Mexico City, Mexico, from October 12 to October 26, 1975, exactly twenty years after the second Pan American Games were held there. It was the third major sporting event held in the Mexican capital in seven years, after the 1968 Summer Olympics and the 1970 FIFA World Cup.

Host city election

Two cities submitted bids to host the 1975 Pan American Games that were recognized by the Pan American Sports Organization. On August 29, 1969, Santiago was selected unanimously over San Juan to host the VII Pan American Games by PASO at its 10th general assembly, held in Cali, Colombia.

In 1973, Santiago dropped out from hosting, and in 1974, its replacement São Paulo did the same. Mexico City was granted the hosting rights with just 10 months to prepare.

Medal count

To sort this table by nation, total medal count, or any other column, click on the  icon next to the column title.

Note
 The medal counts for the United States, Cuba and Canada are disputed.

Sports
 (Track and Field)

References

External links
 Mexico City 1975 - VII Pan American Games - Official Report at PanamSports.org

 
P
P
Multi-sport events in Mexico
Pan American Games
Pan American Games
Sports competitions in Mexico City
1970s in Mexico City
October 1975 sports events in North America
October 1975 events in Mexico